Haddonfield Public Library is a public library in Haddonfield, New Jersey. Dating back to 1803 as the Haddonfield Library Company, it was one of the first libraries established in New Jersey. The current library building, located at 60 Haddon Avenue (adjacent to Tanner Street), opened in 1917 and was renovated in the summer of 2017. High-speed internet wiring, LED lighting, elevators, and extra storage space were part of the $2.2 million renovation.

The library sees approximately 120,000 visits per year and circulates around 135,000 books.

References

External links 

Buildings and structures in Camden County, New Jersey
Public libraries in New Jersey
Haddonfield, New Jersey
1803 establishments in New Jersey
Library buildings completed in 1917